Achille Cutrera (24 April 1929 – 10 October 2018) was an Italian politician.

Cutrera was born in Milan and trained as a lawyer. In the 1970s, he helped publish Il Giornale della Lombardia. He twice won election to the Senate, in 1987 and 1992.

References

1929 births
2018 deaths
20th-century Italian lawyers
Senators of Legislature X of Italy
Senators of Legislature XI of Italy
Lawyers from Milan
Italian Socialist Party politicians
Politicians from Milan